Munya or Muya (also Manyak , Menia 么呢阿) is one of the Qiangic languages spoken in China. There are two dialects, Northern and Southern, which are not mutually intelligible. Most research on Munya has been conducted by Ikeda Takumi. There are about 2,000 monolinguals.

Names
The language has been spelled in various ways, including Manyak, Menya, Minyag, and Minyak. Other names for the language are Boba and Miyao.

Dialects
Ethnologue (21st edition) lists two Muya dialects, namely Eastern (Nyagrong) and Western (Darmdo). Muya is spoken in
Shimian County, Ya'an
Jiulong County
Kangding

Sun (1991) documents Muya (木雅) of Liuba Township (六坝乡), Shade District (沙德区), Kangding County (康定县), Sichuan.

Popular culture
In 2008, Bamu, a singer with the Jiuzhaigou Art Troupe in the Aba Tibetan and Qiang Autonomous Prefecture in Sichuan, recorded an album of Muya songs (木雅七韵).

References

Bibliography

 
 
 
 
 Minyak language elementary textbook, a project of the Kham Aid Foundation, 2009.

Qiangic languages
Languages of China